Beta Psi was a small national men's fraternity founded in 1924 at the University of Illinois. Eventually chartering five chapters, it survived for about 10 years until succumbing to the pressures of the Great Depression.

History

Beta Psi's origin dates to February 1920 when six young men formed a social fraternity in "a junior college in Chicago." The Members of this parent organization who later went to the University of Illinois and the Armour Institute formed local fraternities: Mu Omega Beta at the University of Illinois, and the Sodales Club at Armour Institute. These were both organized in 1922 and their colleges gave permission, in 1923 and 1924 respectively, to proceed with the formation of a national social college fraternity. The Junior college group was dropped, and on August 29, 1924, the state of Illinois chartered the Beta Psi national fraternity. The fraternity however counts its founding as July 19, 1924.

Beta Psi had five chapters at its high point. Too small and too young to survive the financial downturn of the Great Depression, it disbanded abruptly in 1934, with members and chapters dispersing that year.

Governance
Overall governance was by the Grand Council, an in-person meeting held bi-annually, composed of the council of administrators and two delegates from each chapter. In between Grand Councils, the council of administrators was composed of the president, secretary, treasurer, and four additional men, which together formed the governing body of the fraternity.

Chapters and their outcome
In order of founding, its five chapters were as follows. Those active at the time of dissolution are in bold, inactive chapters are in italics.

Insignia
Beta Psi's badge was an equilateral triangle of enameled black, surrounded by a gold border, with the point toward the bottom. This was superimposed by the Greek letters Β and Ψ. The ψ was somewhat larger, encompassing most of the triangle and rendered in polished gold. The Β was superimposed on this, set with 12 pearls. The pledge pin is a gilded shield in which is set a black equilateral triangle. There is a crest shown in the 1927 Cornellian yearbook which was used several times, and appears to be original to the fraternity.

The Fraternity's colors were Black and Gold.

The Fraternity's magazine was The Lamp. The Lamp was issued quarterly starting in 1923.

Demise
Dissolution seems to have been rancorous: Twelve men from the founding chapter, Alpha chapter at Illinois, sought a merger or absorption by the neighboring Alpha Sigma Phi chapter there, whose building was under-occupied at the time. The local IFC, Beta Psi's headquarters and even the NIC sought to suppress this merger. The dispute forced Alpha Sigma Phi to leave the NIC for a period of three years in 1935/36, rejoining in 1938. Some of the Alpha chapter men joined Pi Kappa Phi instead.  Beta chapter eventually became a chapter of Pi Kappa Phi, as noted by Baird's archive. The three other chapters scattered, with some individual members released de facto to join other groups, notably at Cornell and at Middlebury. None of Beta Psi's chapters survived beyond 1935.

References

Defunct fraternities and sororities
Student organizations established in 1924
1924 establishments in Illinois